Devil's Den is a boulder-strewn hill on the south end of Houck's Ridge at Gettysburg Battlefield, used by artillery and sharpshooters on the second day of the 1863 Battle of Gettysburg during the American Civil War.  A tourist attraction since the memorial association era, several boulders are worn from foot traffic and the site includes numerous cannon, memorials, and walkways, including a bridge spanning two boulders.

History
Devil's Den was formed with Little Round Top (to the east-northeast) and Big Round Top (southwest) by periglacial frost wedging of the igneous landform formed 200 million years ago when a diabase sill intruded through the Triassic Gettysburg plain. The feature acquired its foreboding name prior to the 1863 battle. Throughout the mid-19th century, local residents believed that the crevices between the boulders were home to a large snake. The snake became known as "The Devil," and thus the area he was believed to inhabit became known as "The Devil’s Den." Some soldiers' accounts used the name "Devil's Cave", and a depression on a boulder that collects water resembles a flying horned bat.

Battle of Gettysburg 
On July 2, 1863, Smith's Union battery, with six Napoleon smooth-bores, used the hill to counterfire on Confederate artillery prior to McLaws' Assault at 5:30 pm.  Against Hood's Assault that started at 4 pm, Devil's Den was defended by Birney's 1st Division as the far left position from The Peach Orchard Salient of the III Corps.   The hill was captured when the "First Texas Regiment, having pressed forward to the crest of the hill and driven the enemy from his battery", and Anderson's Confederates used the hill for the first attack on The Wheatfield.  From near the Slaughter Pen, the 40th New York Volunteer Infantry Regiment forced the 2nd & 17th Georgia regiments of Benning's Brigade to retreat to Devil's Den. Confederate sharpshooters were stationed between the rocks to fire upon Union soldiers at Little Round Top, among their victims being General Stephen H. Weed and Lieutenant Charles E. Hazlett. Hazlett's guns counter-fired upon them, and many were killed from the concussion of air.

The 124th NY monument with Ellis statue was dedicated near Devil's Den in 1884.  Postbellum avenues were constructed to Devil's Den such as Sickles' Avenue from the west, Crawford Avenue in 1895 (north), and Warren Avenue across Plum Run (east).  From 1894-1916, the Gettysburg Electric Railway operated on a curve crossing Plum Run (Rock Creek) around the south base of the hill with the Tipton Station providing Devil's Den services.  In 1916, a Devil's Den boulder was used as a Satterlee Hospital memorial at Philadelphia's Clark Park.

The nearby 1933 comfort station was demolished in 2009, and its access bridge over Plum Run remains to the east.  In 1952, ROTC students conducted a mock battle at the site, and the "Devil's Den Access Committee" was formed in 1988.  The site's ID Tablet was designated a Historic District Contributing Structure in 2004, and the Devil's Den barricade is structure WA35 on the Gettysburg National Military Park's List of Classified Structures.

References

External links 
History.Net :Devil's Den

Hills of Pennsylvania
Landforms of Adams County, Pennsylvania
Gettysburg Battlefield